Christel House India is a school located in Bangalore, India. It was founded in 2001 as an addition to Christel House International. CHI is a global nonprofit organization that operates five schools around the world specializing in educating youths living in poverty. Now, the school serves more than 800 children annually.

Christel House India has 56 staff members that serve children from kindergarten to 10th grade.

External links 
 ChristelHouse India - Homepage of Christelhouse India site
 ChristelHouse International - Homepage of ChristelHouse International site.

Schools in Bangalore